Vincenzo Maria Farano (21 July 1921 – 17 January 2008) was an Italian prelate of the Catholic Church who worked in the diplomatic service of the Holy See and served as an Apostolic Nuncio to Indonesia and Ecuador before spending more than a decade as Archbishop of Gaeta.

Biography
Vincenzo Maria Farano was born on 21 July 1921 in Trani, Italy. He was ordained a priest on 3 June 1944.

To prepare for a diplomatic career he entered the Pontifical Ecclesiastical Academy in 1952.

On 8 August 1973, Pope Paul VI appointed him titular archbishop of  Cluentum and Apostolic Pro-Nuncio to Indonesia. He received his episcopal consecration on 30 September 1973 from Cardinal Jean-Marie Villot.

On 25 August 1979, Pope John Paul II named him Apostolic Nuncio to Ecuador.

On 14 August 1986, Pope John Paul named him Archbishop of Gaeta. 

Pope John Paul accepted his resignation on 12 February 1997.

He died at his home in Gianola on 17 January 2008 shortly after being released from the hospital.

References

External links 
Catholic Hierarchy: Archbishop Vincenzo Maria Farano 

1921 births
2008 deaths
People from the Province of Barletta-Andria-Trani
Apostolic Nuncios to Indonesia
Apostolic Nuncios to Ecuador